Koreanization or Koreanisation is a cultural and language shift whereby populations adopt Korean language or culture.

Assimilation of Peninsular Japonic speakers 
Many linguists believe that Peninsular Japonic languages were formerly spoken in central and southern parts of the Korean peninsula. These languages were used until the Early Three Kingdoms period. After the end of the Three Kingdoms period in 668AD, former place names which included traces of Peninsular Japonic were replaced by the standardized two-character Sino-Korean names assigned under King Gyeongdeok in the 8th century.

Assimilation of Jurchen 

Both Goryeo and early Joseon kings fought with and against various groups of Jurchens. Sejong the Great resettled Koreans from southern Korea in his northern border area. Jurchens in Joseon were encouraged to intermarry with Koreans.

See also 
 Gaya confederacy

References

Works cited 

 

Cultural assimilation
Korean culture